Pararotruda is a genus of snout moths. It was described by Roesler in 1965, and contains the species Pararotruda nesiotica. It is found on the Canary Islands and Madeira.

The wingspan is 16–18 mm.

References

Phycitinae
Monotypic moth genera
Moths of Africa
Pyralidae genera